Kshiti Goswami (24 January 1943 – 24 November 2019) was an Indian politician from West Bengal belonging to Revolutionary Socialist Party. He was a member of the West Bengal Legislative Assembly.  He was a minister of West Bengal Government as well. He also served as the secretary of Revolutionary Socialist Party's state unit and general secretary of Revolutionary Socialist Party's central committee.

Biography
Goswami was elected as a member of the West Bengal Legislative Assembly from Dhakuria in 1991. He was also elected from Dhakuria in 1996. He was elected again from Dhakuria in 2006.

Goswami was a minister of the West Bengal Government. He served as Public Works Department Minister of West Bengal Government from 1996 to 2001 and 2006 to 2011. He also served as the secretary of Revolutionary Socialist Party's state unit and general secretary of Revolutionary Socialist Party's central committee.

Goswami died on 24 November 2019 at the age of 76.

References

2019 deaths
Revolutionary Socialist Party (India) politicians
West Bengal MLAs 1991–1996
West Bengal MLAs 1996–2001
West Bengal MLAs 2006–2011
1940s births
State cabinet ministers of West Bengal
People from Dakshin Dinajpur district